Kenny Flowers (born March 14, 1964) is a former NFL running back.

References

1964 births
Living people
American football running backs
Atlanta Falcons players
Clemson Tigers football players
Players of American football from Florida
Ed Block Courage Award recipients